Moszczenica Niżna  is a village in the administrative district of Gmina Stary Sącz, within Nowy Sącz County, Lesser Poland Voivodeship, in southern Poland.

1799 a small German settlement was established by Joseph II (Morawina, German Morau) in the northern part of the village.

The village has a population of 860.

References

Villages in Nowy Sącz County